The list of games by Sanritsu/SIMS includes, unless otherwise noted:

Arcade
Bank Panic (バンクパニック) (1983)
Change Leon (???) (1982)
Combat Hawk (1987)
Dr. Micro (1983)
Dream Shopper (1982)
Get Bass: Sega Bass Fishing (ゲットバス ソフト単品) / Sega Bass Fishing (1998)
Janputer (1981)
Jantotsu Super (1983)
Kikiipatsu Mayumi-chan (1988)
Mahjong Kyou Jidai (1986)
Maximum Speed (2003)
Mermaid / Yachtsman (1982)
Quiz Ah! Megami Sama: Tatakau Tsubasa Totomo Ni (クイズ ああっ女神さまっ　～闘う翼とともに～ 通常版) (2000)
Quiz Jump (1983)
Red Selector (1982)
Ron 2-nin Mahjong (1980)
Ron 2-nin Mahjong 2 (1980)
Roppyakuken (1983)
Rougien (1982)
Sega Marine Fishing (セガマリンフィッシング) (1999)
Space War (Clone of Space Invaders) (1978)
Sports Shooting USA (2003)
Triple Punch (1982)
Van-Van Car (1983)

Nintendo Entertainment System

Master System
Aerial Assault (1990)
Air Rescue (1992)
Alien Storm (1991)
Assault City (1990)
Bomber Raid (1988)
Bonanza Bros. (1991)
Buggy Run (1993)
Disney's Aladdin (1994)
Dynamite Duke (1991)
E-SWAT (1990)
Forgotten Worlds (1990)
G-LOC: Air Battle (1991)
Gain Ground (1990)
George Foreman's KO Boxing (1992)
Golfamania (1990)
James "Buster" Douglas Knockout Boxing (US) / Heavyweight Champ (PAL) (1990)
Line of Fire (1991)
Masters of Combat (1993)
Master of Darkness (PAL) / Vampire (BR) (1992)
Ninja Gaiden (1992)
Psychic World (1991)
Putt & Putter / Minigolf (1992)
Slap Shot (1990)
Tecmo World Cup '93 (1993)
Tennis Ace (1989)
Tom and Jerry: The Movie (1992)
Wanted (1989)
Wimbledon (1992)
Wimbledon II (1993)

Mega Drive/Genesis

On October 12, 1990, Sanritsu published Fatman, developed by Activision, in Japan

Game Gear
Alien Syndrome (エイリアンシンドローム) (1992)
Buster Fight (バスター・ファイト) (1994)
Disney's Aladdin (1994)
Fantasy Zone Gear: Opa Opa Jr. no Bouken (ファンタジーゾーンGear オパオパJr.の冒険) (JP) (1991)
Fantasy Zone (US, EU)
Fred Couples Golf (1994)
From TV Animation Slam Dunk: Shouri heno Starting 5 (テレビアニメ スラムダンク 勝利へのスターティング5) (1994)
George Foreman's KO Boxing (1992)
Godzilla: Kaijuu Daishingeki (ゴジラ～怪獣大進撃～) (1995)
Heavyweight Champ (ヘビーウェイト チャンプ) (1991)
Honoo no Tokyuuji: Dodge Danpei (炎の闘球児ドッジ弾平) (1992)
In the Wake of Vampire (JP) (1992)
Vampire: Master of Darkness (US, EU, BR)
J.League Soccer: Dream Eleven (1995)
J.League GG Pro Striker '94 (JリーグGGプロストライカー'94) (1994)
Kick & Rush (JP) (1993)
Tengen World Cup Soccer (US, EU)
McDonald's: Ronald no Magical World (マクドナルド～ドナルドのマジカルワールド) (1994)
Megami Tensei Gaiden: Last Bible (女神転生外伝～ラストバイブル～) (1994)
Megami Tensei Gaiden: Last Bible Special (女神転生外伝ラストバイブルスペシャル) (1995)
Mighty Morphin Power Rangers (1994)
Mighty Morphin Power Rangers: The Movie (1995)
Out Run (アウトラン) (1991)
Putt & Putter (パット＆パター) (1991)
Minigolf (BR)
Scratch Golf (スクラッチゴルフ) (1994)
Tails' Sky Patrol (テイルスのスカイパトロール) (1995) Co-developed with JSH
Tempo Jr. (テンポＪＲ．) (1995)
Tom and Jerry: The Movie (トム＆ジェリー[ザ・ムービー]) (1993)
Wimbledon (ウィンブルドン) (1992)

Mega CD/Sega CD

Sega Saturn

PlayStation

Dreamcast

PlayStation 2

* Included in Sega Classics Collection, published by Sega in the US and Europe

Nintendo GameCube

Wii

Sanritsu SIMS